The Husband She Met Online is a television film that premiered on Lifetime on October 26, 2013.

Plot
Rachel Maleman (Meredith Monroe) is an event planner at a hotel in Philadelphia. She previously dated her co-worker John Anderson (Brett Watson), however, she broke off their 3-year relationship after he got drunk and cheated on her at a work convention. She also works alongside her roommate/best friend, Laura (Krista Morin). Rachel begins online dating and meets Craig Miller (Jason Gray-Stanford), a wealthy businessman who runs his mother's real estate company. The two start going on dates where Craig charms Rachel with his extravagant gestures and playful personality, however, John still has feelings for Rachel. Despite Rachel concealing her new boyfriend from John, he finds out since he saw them at the hotel bar together, along with other clues like Craig sending Rachel a bouquet of her favorite flowers. John reveals this knowledge during an early dinner with Rachel where he again genuinely implores her to take him back, which Rachel tells him she'll consider. Rachel had lied to Craig about the dinner, but he was suspicious and spied on her, also escalating to stalking her outside her house and having his tech guy bug Rachel's computer so he can monitor her emails. Overcome with jealousy, Craig sends his brother Ryan (Damon Runyan) to kill John, telling him John is a friend of his ex-girlfriend's out to ruin them. A private investigator named Jerry Berman (Bill Lake) is hired by the father of one of Craig's ex-girlfriends, Dominique (Allison Brennan), who went missing. She was murdered by Craig when she told him that she was pregnant. He investigates another woman that Craig dated, Melissa (Sophie Gendron); she was assaulted by Craig, and he paid her to drop the charges against him and tell the authorities she lied about Craig hitting her. After dating Rachel for a while with John out of the picture, Craig proposes to her. While wedding dress shopping, Craig stops by the boutique and picks out/purchases the dress he wants Rachel to wear, ignoring her and Laura's opinions. Craig also asks his fiancée to move in with him, quit her job, and start her own event planning business under him, so that he can spend more time with her. Jerry stops by Rachel's office and fills her in about Craig's ex-girlfriends, but when she raises these concerns to Craig, he only acts dismissive and claims that people always lie about his family to get money out of them. After calling various resources and discussing matters with Laura, Rachel becomes uncertain about marrying Craig and confronts him about all he's been hiding. They get into an argument and when Rachel says she wants a break from Craig, he tackles her to the bed and handcuffs her to it for the night. The next morning, Ryan stops by to drop off Rachel's dress and she screams for him to help, but Craig ushers him out of the bedroom to explain himself. Ryan tries to talk Craig out of the plot, but soon gets fed up and leaves, telling his brother to handle his own mess. Craig then explains to Rachel that she must call her boss and quit, because they're immediately getting married at a courthouse and then flying to Belize. He says if she tries to run or get help in any way, he will kill Laura (who was revealed to be pregnant by an ex-boyfriend) and make it look like an accident. He also makes Rachel abandon her dog, Cody, at the side of the road - he is soon rescued whilst Rachel and Craig are wed at the courthouse. A veterinarian calls Laura about Cody being found, which confuses her since when Rachel called her, she claimed she and Craig were bringing Cody on their sudden honeymoon. Due to her suspicions, she tells Jerry about what's happened. Ryan, who was drowning in guilt after killing John, tells Jerry about Craig's plans. With reinforcements close behind, Jerry confronts Craig at his airport with a gun aimed at him, but Craig grabs Rachel and points a gun at her. During the stand-off, Rachel elbows Craig and manages to escape his grasp, with Jerry shooting him several times. He dies and Rachel tearfully removes her ring. About a year later, Rachel, Laura, Cody and Laura's young daughter are peacefully enjoying their time at a park.

Cast
 Jason Gray-Stanford as Craig Miller
 Meredith Monroe as Rachel Maleman 
Brett Watson as John Anderson
Damon Runyan as Ryan Miller
Krista Morin as Laura 
 Bill Lake as Jerry Berman
 Mimi Kuzyk as Dorris Miller
Stephen MacDonald as Kevin 
Sophie Gendron as Melissa
Allison Brennan as Dominique

References

External links

2013 drama films
Films about weddings
Films set in Philadelphia
Lifetime (TV network) films
American drama television films
2013 films
2010s English-language films
2010s American films